Solomon Alaimalo (born 27 December 1995) is a New Zealand rugby union player who currently plays as an outside back for Southland in New Zealand's domestic Mitre 10 Cup and for the  in the international Super Rugby competition.

Senior career

Alaimalo debuted for Northland during the 2016 Mitre 10 Cup and immediately became a key figure for them, starting all 10 of their championship games, scoring 2 tries in the process.

Super Rugby

Alaimalo was named in the  squad ahead of the 2017 Super Rugby season.

In November 2020, it was announced that Alaimalo would be moving to the Highlanders after being granted an early release from the Chiefs.

References

1995 births
New Zealand rugby union players
New Zealand sportspeople of Samoan descent
Rugby union fullbacks
Rugby union wings
Northland rugby union players
Rugby union players from Auckland
Living people
Chiefs (rugby union) players
Tasman rugby union players
Waikato rugby union players
Highlanders (rugby union) players
Southland rugby union players